CD Basket Mar Gijón, also known was Ascensores Tresa by sponsorship reasons, is a Spanish women's basketball team based in Gijón, Asturias that currently plays in Liga Femenina 2.

History 

Club Basket Mar Gijón was founded in 1997 to replace Unión Scotch Club, that was dissolved. The senior team started playing in the regional league until 2005, when it promoted to Primera Nacional (third tier).

First season (1997–98) played against Colegio Paula Frassinetti (Doroteas), Cosmos, Dados, El Pilar, Juventud Astur (Aucalsa Oviedo), King Rocky, Talleres Marín and Ventura Sport.

On 21 May 2017, Basket Mar promoted to Liga Femenina 2 by winning the promotion stage played in Barañain, Navarre.

However, despite avoiding relegation, the club finally was dissolved and its structure integrated in another local women's basketball team.

Season by season

Youth teams
Basket Mar youth teams have stood out at regional level. The under-18 team won the Asturian Championship consecutively from 2013 to 2016. At the 2016 Spanish under-18 Championship, Basket Mar reached the round of 16, where they lost against CB Conquero 45–62. Until 2016, they received the name of Basket Mar-Grupo thanks to an agreement with Real Grupo de Cultura Covadonga.

References

External links
Official website 
Profile at Asturcesto 

Basketball teams established in 1997
1997 establishments in Asturias
Women's basketball teams in Spain
Sport in Gijón
2018 disestablishments in Asturias
Basketball teams disestablished in 2018
Basketball teams in Asturias